Vekeana Dhillon is a screenwriter, series creator, playwright, television presenter, radio presenter and actress.

Early life and education
She was born in New Delhi, India and later her family migrated to Toronto, Canada. Raised in Alberta, Canada and went on to graduate with a Bachelor of Science from Simon Fraser University in British Columbia.

Career
Uncovidable is the latest series Vekeana Dhillon has created and written based on her humorous and semi biographical account of her experiences during the COVID-19 lock-down. Season One of 21 episodes in English voiced by Mahira Kakkar released on 23 June 2020 on the Amazon's Audible platform worldwide. Upon its success, the Hindi version of the series voiced by Rasika Dugal released on 24 September 2020 on Audible.in and Audible Suno.

Vekeana Dhillon has written the Virat Kohli animation superhero series Super V (2019-2020) for Disney+ Hotstar, Marvel HQ, Star TV Network, and Baweja Movies. It was directed by Puneet Sira and Season 1 premiered in over 70 countries on 5 November 2019 and went on to become the highest rated show in the animation bracket in India.

As a Series Creator she is writing several premium content shows that have secured placements on several major OTT platforms.

Vekeana is the creator and writer of The Great Punjabi Luv Shuv Story (2017) a series for Ekta Kapoor's digital channel Alt Balaji produced by Eyeline Entertainment.

Vekeana Dhillon has written the high end musical play Balle Balle (2017-2018) for Wizcraft International Entertainment, Directed by Viraf Sarkari.

She has had five feature films produced and released internationally among them being I - Proud To Be An Indian (2004) Produced by Sohail Khan and Directed by Puneet Sira, Jai Veeru (2009) Produced by Siddi Vinayak Movies, and Kisaan  (2009) again Produced by Sohail Khan and Directed by Puneet Sira, and Pinky Moge Wali (2012) Directed by Vikram Dhillon.

Additional feature film scripts include Ji Karda (Eyeline Entertainment) Director Vikram Dhillon. The remake of Kurbani (FK International)  and Hoshiyar Havaldar (Mirchi Movies). Her screenplay Foot It, a family/dance feature film, with Corus Entertainment / Rugged Media and a horror feature film for Telefilm Canada.

Dhillon's association with the entertainment industry was initially as an actor.  Snip (2000) was her first feature film in which she played the tenacious gossip driven Delnaz Readymoney, followed by shorts for MTV in leading roles in Love Ke Liye and One Tight Slap which led to Bollywood Bound, a National Film Board of Canada documentary-feature following the lives of Vekeana Dhillon, Vikram Dhillon, Neeru Bajwa and Ruby Bhatia as transplanted Canadians in the world of Bollywood.  Vekeana was hired by Rupert Murdoch's Channel [V] where she became the face and personality of several shows that she hosted including the channel's prime-time slotted [V] Dares U with co-host Yudi Urs and [V] Challenge with brother Vikram Dhillon.

Vekeana parlayed her Bollywood experiences as a contributor and reporter for the BBC Asian Network (U.K.) where she did a two year stint with her own weekly half-hour slot on the Nikki Bedi Show, in addition to reporting for regional BBC stations in the UK. Vekeana shared her voice and news with the BBC World Service and BBC General News Service.

Personal life
She is the daughter of Lyricist Harcharan Dhillon and retired Environmental Health Officer Dyal Singh Dhillon.  She's worked extensively with her producer/director brother, Vikram Dhillon, and currently lives in India with her husband, noted director/producer Puneet Sira whom she married in 2010.

Filmography

See also
 Women's Cinema

References

External links
 

Living people
1970 births
Actresses from Delhi
Indian emigrants to Canada
Canadian women screenwriters
Canadian film actresses
Canadian television actresses
Canadian people of Punjabi descent
Canadian writers of Asian descent
Canadian actresses of Indian descent
Canadian expatriate actresses in India
Punjabi people
Date of birth missing (living people)
20th-century Canadian actresses
20th-century Canadian screenwriters
20th-century Canadian women writers
21st-century Canadian screenwriters
21st-century Canadian women writers
21st-century Canadian actresses